Are You Okay? is the fourth album by art-funk ensemble Was (Not Was). It was released in 1990. It was their last album for 18 years until 2008’s Boo!

Track listing
All tracks composed by David Was and Don Was; except where indicated.

 "Are You Okay?" – 4:28
 "Papa Was a Rollin' Stone" (Barrett Strong, Norman Whitfield) – 6:41
 "I Feel Better Than James Brown" – 4:45
 "How the Heart Behaves" – 5:35
 "Maria Novarro" – 3:27
 "I Blew Up the United States" – 3:51
 "In K Mart Wardrobe" – 4:16
 "Elvis' Rolls Royce" – 3:29
 "Dressed to Be Killed" (Was, Was, G Love E)– 4:13
 "Just Another Couple Broken Hearts" – 4:55
 "You! You! You!" (Was, Was, Luis Resto) – 3:28
 "Look What's Back" – 0:43

Personnel
Don Was - bass, keys
David Was - flute, keyboards, vocals
Sweet Pea Atkinson - vocals
Sir Harry Bowens - vocals
Donald Ray Wilson - vocals
David McMurray - saxophone
Randy Jacobs - guitar
Jamie Muhoberac - keyboards
Debra Dobkin - percussion, vocals
Rayse Biggs - trumpet
Ron Pangborn - drums

Contributors
Leonard Cohen - lead vocals on "Elvis' Rolls Royce"
G Love E - rap on "Papa Was a Rolling Stone", "Are You Okay" and "Dressed To Be Killed"
Syd Straw - lead vocals on "You! You! You!"
The Roches - vocals on "Maria Novarro"
Jeff Lorber - keyboard arranging, programming, performance on "Are You Okay", "Just Another Couple Broken Hearts", "In K-Mart Wardrobe", "How The Heart Behaves" and "I Feel Better Than James Brown"
Iggy Pop, Downtown Julie Brown and Ewreck Benson - backing vocals on "Elvis' Rolls Royce"
Doug Fieger - backing vocals on "I Blew Up The United States" and "Dressed To Be Killed"
Brad Buxer - additional keyboards on "How The Heart Behaves"
Luis Resto - keyboards on "You! You! You!"
Paul Riser - string and horn arrangements on "Just Another Couple Broken Hearts", "How The Heart Behaves" and "Elvis' Rolls Royce"
Andy Gill - backing vocals on "Dressed To Be Killed"
Jon Jaz-Was - saxophonic reticulation
Produced by Don Was and David Was
Executive Producer - David Bates
Mixed by Keith Cohen and Ed Cherney
Additional production on "How The Heart Behaves" - Keith Cohen

References

1990 albums
Was (Not Was) albums
Albums arranged by Paul Riser
Albums produced by Don Was
Albums produced by David Was
Fontana Records albums